The Hampshire Book Awards are an annual series of literary awards given to works of children's literature. The awards are run by Hampshire County Council's School Library Service.

There are three awards: Hampshire Book Award, Hampshire Illustrated Book Award and Hampshire Picture Book Award. A fourth award, the Hampshire Information Book Award, is being piloted in 2013.

Hampshire Book Award
The Hampshire Book Award is given to works of children's literature published in paperback during the previous year. Around June every year, the final is held and selected Year 8 students from schools across Hampshire attend it in order to vote for the winning book. A celebration event for the award is held in October, and where possible, the winning author is invited to attend.

Winners and shortlists
2019 Shell by Paula Rawsthorne
Things a Bright Girl Can Do by Sally Nicholls
Satellite by Nick Lake
The Extinction Trials by S. M. Wilson
Scarecrow by Danny Weston
Refugee by Alan Gratz
2018 Instructions of a Second Hand Heart by Tamsyn Murray
A Dangerous Crossing by Jane Mitchell
The Island at the End of Everything by Kiran Millwood Hargrave
Between the Lies by Cathy McPhail
Fir by Sharon Gosling
A Seven-Letter Word by Kim Slater
2017 River of Ink by Helen Dennis
My Name's Not Friday by Jon Walter
The Bubble Boy by Stewart Foster
Island by Nicky Singer, illustrated by Chris Riddell
Night Vision by Ella West
Railhead by Philip Reeve
2016 Looking at the Stars by Jo Cotterill
Winterkill by Kate A Boorman
Apple and Rain by Sarah Crossan
Devil You Know by Cathy MacPhail
The Boundless by Kenneth Oppel
Smart by Kim Slater
2015 The Screaming Staircase by Jonathan Stroud
2014 Hostage by Chris Bradford
2013 My Sister Lives on the Mantelpiece by Annabel Pitcher
2012 Half Brother by Kenneth Oppel
Burning Secrets by Clare Chambers
Outlaw by Stephen Davies
Reckless by Cornelia Funke
Theodore Boone: Young Lawyer by John Grisham
Angel by L.A. Weatherly
2011 Time Riders by Alex Scarrow
Diary of a Wimpy Vampire by Tim Collins
Halo by Zizou Corder
Two Good Thieves by Daniel Finn
Moster Repuplic by Ben Horton
Young Sherlock Holmes: Death Cloud by Andrew Lane
2010 Hunger Games by Suzanne Collins 
Dot Robot by Jason Bradbury
The Devil's Kiss by Sarwat Chadda
Bang Bang You're Dead by Narinder Dhami
The Graveyard Book by Neil Gaiman
Medusa Project: The Set-Up by Sophie McKenzie
2009 Dogfight by Craig Simpson
Foundling (Monster Blood Tattoo) by D.M. Cornish
Dragonfly by Julia Golding
Between Two Seas by Marie-Louise Jensen
Crusade by Elizabeth Laird
Outcast by Michelle Paver
2008 Skulduggery Pleasant by Derek Landy
The Boy in the Striped Pyjamas by John Boyne
Nathan Fox: Dangerous Times by L. Brittney
School's Out Forever by James Patterson
H.I.V.E by Mark Walden
Kat Got Your Tongue by Lee Weatherly
2007 Percy Jackson and the Lightning Thief by Rick Riordan
Ellen's People by Dennis Hamley
Evil Star by Anthony Horowitz
Peter Raven Under Fire by Michael Molloy
CHERUB: Divine Madness by Robert Muchamore
The Devil's Footsteps by E.E. Richardson
2006 The Spook's Apprentice by Joseph Delaney
Merrow by Louise Cooper
The Heaven Shop by Deborah Ellis
Blood Pressure by Alan Gibbons
Mudlark by John Sedden
Ruby Tanya by Robert Swindells
2005 Private Peaceful by Michael Morpurgo
Unique by Alison Allen-Grey
Boy2Girl by Terence Blacker
Iqbal by Francesco D'Adamo
Horace by Chris d'Lacey
The Voyage of the Snake Lady by Theresa Tomlinson
2004 A Little Piece of Ground by Elizabeth Laird
Trollogy by Steve Barlow
Fat Boy Swim by Catherine Forde
Another Me by Catherine MacPhail
Keeper by Mal Peet
Child X by Lee Weatherly
2003 Skeleton Key by Anthony Horowitz
Exodus by Julie Bertagna
Nightland by Robert Dodds
Stella by Catherine Johnson
Mortal Engines by Philip Reeve
Match of Death by James Riordan

Hampshire Illustrated Book Award
The Hampshire Illustrated Book Award is an annual award given to illustrated works of children's literature. The award is judged by children in Year 5 and run by Hampshire County Council's School Library Service. The shortlist is announced in October each year, and the winner in December. An award ceremony is held in March the following year.

Winners and shortlists
2017 Where the Bugaboo Lives by Sean Taylor and Neal Layton
Imaginary Fred by Eoin Colfer and Oliver Jeffers
Finding Winnie by Lindsay Mattick and Sophie Blackall  
Ossiri and the Bala Mengro by Richard O'Neill and Katharine Quarmby
Pet Dragon by  Mark Robertson and Sally Symes
Lucinda Belinda Melinda McCool by Jeanne Willis and Tony Ross
2016 The Cat, The Dog, Little Red, The Exploding Eggs, The Wolf and Grandma’s Wardrobe by Diane Fox and Christyan Fox.
2015 Winter's Child by Angela McAllister and Grahame Baker-Smith
2014 The Day the Crayons Quit by Drew Daywalt and Oliver Jeffers
 Where The Poppies Now Grow by Hilary Robinson and Martin Impey
 Journey by Aaron Becker
 Jemmy Button by Valerio Vidali
 Weasels by Elys Dolan
2013  Pirates Next Door by Jonny Duddle
 Maude: The Not-So-Noticeable Shrimpton by Lauren Child & Tricia Krauss
 The Spider and the Fly by Tony DiTerlizzi
 The Frank Show by David Mackintosh
 Black Dog by Levi Pinfold
 How Dinosaurs Really Work by Alan Snow
2012 Marshall Armstrong is New to Our School by David Mackintosh
Happiness is a Watermelon on your Head by Stella Dreis, translated by Daniel Hahn
Three by the Sea by Mini Grey
Major Glad, Major Dizzy by Jan Oke
The Lion & the Mouse by Jerry Pinkney
Iggy Wilder, Great Lost Dog Adventure by Marcia Williams
2011 The Santa Trap by Jonathan Emmett and Poly Bernatene
Me and You by Anthony Browne
Crazy Hair by Neil Gaiman and Dave McKean
In Flanders Fields by Norman Jorgensen and Brian Harrison-Levin
Rumblewick and the Dinner Dragons by Hiawyn Oram and Sarah Warburton
The Lost Thing by Shaun Tan
2010 Tortoise vs Hare: the re-match by Preston Rutt and Ben Redlich
Iggy Peck, Architect by Andrea Beatty
Child's Garden by Michael Foreman
Lion Journal by Carolyn Franklin
Goal! by Mina Javerherbin
Leon and the Place Between by Angela McAllister and Grahame Baker-Smith
2009 Don't Read This Book by Jill Lewis and Deborah Alwright
Here Comes Frankie by Tim Hopgood
Stone Age Boy by Satoshi Kitamura
The Robot and the Bluebird by David Lucas
The Boy, the Bear, the Baron and the Bard by Gregory Rogers
Wonderful Life by Helen Ward
2008 Scoop! An exclusive by Monty Molenski by John Kelly and Cathy Tincknell
We're Riding on a Caravan by Laurie Krebs
Meerkat Mail by Emily Gravett
Dali and the Path of Dreams by Anna Obiols and Subirani
The Flower (book) by John Light and Lisa Evans
Varmints by Helen Ward and Mark Craste
2007 Castles by Colin Thompson
The Wizard, the Ugly and the Book of Shame by Pablo Bernasconi
Wolves by Emily Gravett
Traction Man is Here by Mini Grey
Baby Brains Superstar by Simon James
The Incredible Book Eating Boy by Oliver Jeffers
2006 The Whisperer by Nick Butterworth
Tadpole's Promise by Jeanne Willis and Tony Ross
Once Upon an Ordinary School Day by Colin McNaughton
Into the Forest by Anthony Browne
Dougal's Deep Sea Diary by Simon Bartram
The Dragon Machine by Helen Ward
2005 The Dot by Peter H. Reynolds
Bob Robber and Dancing Jane by A Matthews
The King with the Horses Ears by Eric Madden
The Wolves in the Walls by Neil Gaiman and Dave McKean
Rapunzel! A Groovy Fairy Tale by David Roberts
Ringle Tingle Tiger by M Austin
2004 The Adventures of a Nose by Vivianne Schwarz and Joel Stewart
Two Frogs by Chris Wormell
Cinderella by David Roberts and Lynn Roberts
Blue John by Berlie Doherty
Ben's Magic Telescope by Brian Patten

Hampshire Picture Book Award
The Hampshire Picture Book Award is an annual award given to works of children's literature published in paperback during the previous year. The award is judged by children in Year 1 and run by Hampshire County Council's School Library Service. The shortlist is announced in January each year, and the winner announced in April. In May 2012, an award ceremony was held for the first time for the Hampshire Picture Book Award.

Winners and shortlists
2019 You’re called What?! by Kes Gray, illustrated by Nikki Dyson
2018 Danny McGee Drinks the Sea by Andy Stanton, illustrated by Neal Layton
2017 Hoot Owl, Master of Disguise by Sean Taylor, illustrated by Jean Jullien
2016 Use Your Imagination by Nicola O'Byrne
2015 Supertato by Sue Hendra
2014
2013 Wolf Won't Bite by Emily Gravett
2012 Otto the Book Bear by Katie Cleminson
Angelica Sprocket's Pockets by Quentin Blake
Sir Laughalot by Tony Mitton and Sarah Warburton
Bedtime for Monsters by Ed Vere
2011 This is My Book by Mick Inkpen
What the Ladybird Heard by Julia Donaldson and Lydia Monks
My mum has X-ray Vision by Angela McAllister and Alex T. Smith
Loon on the Moon by Chae Strathie and Emily Golden
2010 Super Daisy and the Peril of Planet Pea by Kes Gray and Nick Sharratt
Little Boat by Thomas Docherty
Class Three all at Sea by Julia Jarman
Wolf's Magnificent Master Plan by Melanie Williamson

Hampshire Information Book Award
The Hampshire Information Book Award is being piloted in 2013. It will be awarded to a work of children's non fiction published in paperback in the previous year. The award will be judged by children in Year 4 and run by Hampshire County Council's School Library Service. Ten schools are participating in the inaugural award. The shortlist will be announced on 25 January 2013.

References

External links

Hampshire Book Award
Hampshire Illustrated Book Award
Hampshire Picture Book Award
Hampshire School Library Service
Hampshire County Council
Hampshire Book Award at Booktrust 
Hampshire Book Award Shortlist 2003

British children's literary awards
Arts in Hampshire
Awards established in 2003
2003 establishments in England
Hampshire County Council